Abdeen Palace is a historic Cairo palace built as one of the official residences for the former ruling monarchy and royal family of Egypt. It is now one of the official residences and the principal workplace of the President of Egypt, located above Qasr el-Nil Street in eastern Downtown Cairo, Egypt.

Overview 
Built on the site of a small mansion owned by Abdeen Bey, Abdeen Palace, which is named after him, has adornments, paintings, and a large number of clocks scattered in the parlors and wings, most of which are decorated with pure gold. Built under the rule of Ismail Pasha, to become Egypt's official government headquarters instead of the Citadel of Cairo (which had been the center of Egyptian government since the Middle Ages), this palace was used as well for official events and ceremonies.

The construction started in 1863 and continued for 10 years and the palace was officially inaugurated in 1874. Erected on an area of 24 feddans, the palace was designed by the French architect Léon Rousseau along with a large number of Egyptian, Italian, French and European decorators. A new wing was added by Joseph Urban in 1891. However, the palace's garden was added in 1921 by Sultan Fuad I on an area of 20 feddans. The cost of building the palace reached £E700,000 in addition to £E2 million for its furnishing. Between four palaces, King Fuad spent more than 18 million French francs with just one Parisian furniture manufacturer Linke & Cie. More money was also spent on the palace's alteration, preservation and maintenance by consecutive rulers. The palace has 500 rooms.

Museum
The palace today is a museum, located in the Old Cairo district of Abdin. The upper floors (the former living quarters of the royal family) are reserved for visiting foreign dignitaries. The lower floors contain the Silver Museum, the Arms Museum, the Royal Family Museum, and the Presidential Gifts Museum. A new museum, the Historical Documents Museum, was opened in January 2005. Among other documents, it contains the Imperial Ottoman firman, or decree, which established the rule of Muhammad Ali and his family, and a certificate for the Order of the Iron Crown, from the short-lived South American Kingdom of Araucanía and Patagonia.

See also
Abdeen Palace Incident of 1942

References

External links

 Egypt's Royal Archives: 1922-52
  historical Abdeen Palace: Archives housed in the palace

Museums in Cairo
Palaces in Cairo
Art museums and galleries in Egypt
History museums in Egypt
Presidential palaces in Egypt
Royal residences in Egypt
Muhammad Ali dynasty
Tourist attractions in Cairo
Tourist attractions in Egypt
Houses completed in 1874
Neoclassical architecture in Egypt
Downtown Cairo
1874 establishments in Egypt
19th-century architecture in Egypt